The 2011 ACC men's soccer season is the 29th season of men's college soccer in the Atlantic Coast Conference. The defending regular season champions are the North Carolina Tar Heels and the defending postseason champions are the Maryland Terrapins.

Colleges

Head coaching changes

Standings

Final table

Poll standings

Results

See also
Atlantic Coast Conference

External links